() is the regulator of broadcasting and online media in Ireland.

The commission was established in 2023 as a successor body to the Broadcasting Authority of Ireland.

The commission came into being on 15 March 2023 under amendments to the Broadcasting Act 2009 made by the Online Safety and Media Regulation Act 2022.

The new framework has been described as "establish[ing] a robust regulatory framework for online safety in response to the emergence of non-traditional and on-demand media so that regulation of these forms of media are on an equal footing with that of traditional media broadcasting".

Members of the Commission
Members of Coimisiún na Meán:
 Jeremy Godfrey as Executive Chairperson;
 Niamh Hodnett as Online Safety Commissioner;
 Rónán Ó Domhnaill as Media Development Commissioner; and
 Celene Craig as Broadcasting Commissioner

See also
Communications in Ireland
Mass media in Ireland

References

External links

Regulation in Ireland
Organizations established in 2023
Broadcasting authorities
2023 establishments in Ireland
Department of Tourism, Culture, Arts, Gaeltacht, Sport and Media
Mass media regulation
Broadcasting in Ireland